The Classic All Blacks is a rugby union team made up of former New Zealand Rugby (Men's) representatives. It is not an official national team of New Zealand. First put together in 2007, the team has played Japan three times, English Premiership side Leicester Tigers and 'classic' teams from France and Australia.

In 2013, the side played Fiji as part of the Fiji Rugby Union's centennial anniversary.

On 7 October 2015, the Classic All Blacks played RC Toulonnais at the Stade Mayol in a match to honour the late Jerry Collins.

Matches against International sides

Overall

Squad for 2015 Jerry Collins honorary match
The provisional squad to play Toulon on 7 October 2015.

 Head Coach –  Andy Haden

References

New Zealand national rugby union team